1994 J.League Cup Final was the 3rd final of the J.League Cup competition. The final was played at Kobe Universiade Memorial Stadium in Hyogo on August 6, 1994. Verdy Kawasaki won the championship.

Match details

See also
1994 J.League Cup

References

J.League Cup
1994 in Japanese football
Tokyo Verdy matches
Júbilo Iwata matches